Copeoglossum is a genus of skinks. They were previously placed in the genus Mabuya.

Species
The following five species, listed alphabetically by specific name, are recognized as being valid:

Copeoglossum arajara (Reboucas-Spieker, 1981) – Arajara mabuya 
Copeoglossum aurae Hedges & Conn, 2012 – Greater Windward skink
Copeoglossum margaritae Hedges & Conn, 2012 – Margarita skink
Copeoglossum nigropunctatum (Spix, 1825) – Black-spotted skink
Copeoglossum redondae Hedges & Conn, 2012 – Redonda skink(extinct)

Nota bene: A binomial authority in parentheses indicates that the species was originally described in a genus other than Copeoglossum.

References

 
Lizard genera
Taxa named by Johann Jakob von Tschudi